The 2003 South American Rugby Championship was the 25th edition of the competition of the leading national Rugby Union teams in South America.

The tournament was played in Montevideo, with four team participating. Paraguay and Brazil (winner of 2002 "B" championship play before a play-off to obtain qualification.

Argentina won the tournament.

Preliminary

Final Phase

Standings 
 Three point for victory, two for draw, and one for lost 
{| class="wikitable"
|-
!width=165|Team
!width=40|Played
!width=40|Won
!width=40|Drawn
!width=40|Lost
!width=40|For
!width=40|Against
!width=40|Difference
!width=40|Pts
|- bgcolor=#ccffcc align=center
|align=left| 
|3||3||0||0||225||3||+ 222||9
|- align=center
|align=left| 
|3||2||0||1||73||52||+ 21||7
|- align=center
|align=left| 
|3||1||0||2||118||69||+ 49||5
|- align=center
|align=left| 
|3||0||0||3||7||299||- 292||3
|}

Results
 
First Round

Second Round

Third Round

References

2003
A
2003 in Argentine rugby union
rugby union
rugby union
rugby union
rugby union
International rugby union competitions hosted by Uruguay
2003 rugby union tournaments for national teams